This list of museum ships is a sortable, annotated list of notable museum ships around the world.  This includes "ships preserved in museums" defined broadly, but is intended to be limited to substantial (large) ships or, in a few cases, very notable boats or dugout canoes or the like.  This does not include submarines; see List of submarine museums for those.  This includes ships formerly serving as museums or preserved at museums, as well as current ones.  This includes ships on static display or floating and sometimes used for excursions.  It includes only genuine historic ships; replica ships, some associated with museums, are listed separately in the List of ship replicas.

Some historic ships actively used for excursions, and not previously or currently associated with museums, are included in the list of classic vessels.  For shipwrecks that may be visited by diving, including some perhaps associated with museums, see List of shipwrecks.

Ships whose coordinates are included below may be seen together in map accessed by clicking on "Map all coordinates using OpenStreetMap" at the right side of this page.

Africa

Asia

Brunei

China

Former

India

former

Indonesia

Japan

former

Mauritius

Malaysia

former

Myanmar

Norte Korea

Pakistan

South Korea

former

Taiwan

Thailand

Turkey

Oceania
Australia, New Zealand, part of Indonesia and even part of the United States are included in the continent of Oceania, broadly defined.  There are no known museum ships are in the Oceania part of Indonesia.  See List of museum ships in the United States subsection of this "List of museum ships" for the few in Hawaii.

Australia 

Note there are more in Commons category:Museum ships of Australia, though some may be replicas.

Former

New Zealand 

Former

South America

Former

North America

Includes examples in Canada, Cuba, Mexico, and the United States.

Europe
Technically a few ships on the Istanbul side of the Bosporus and Dardanelles are in Europe, but all of Turkey's museum ships are presented together in the Asia section of this "List of museum ships".

Austria

Belgium

Bulgaria

Croatia

Denmark 

Former

Egypt

Estonia

Finland

France 

Former

Germany 

Former

Greece

Hungary

Iceland

Ireland

Israel

Italy 

former

Malta

Netherlands

Norway

Monaco

Poland 

Former

Portugal

Russia 

Former

Spain

Sweden

United Kingdom 

Former

See also
 List of museum ships in North America
 Barcelona Charter
 List of ancient ships
 List of classic vessels
 List of lightships of the United States
 List of maritime museums in the United States
 List of museum ships of the United States military
 List of oldest surviving ships
 Ship replica
 Ships preserved in museums
 Viking ship replica

Notes

References

Bibliography

External links 
 British Maritime Heritage Sites
 Historic Naval Ships Visitors' Guide
 Historic Ocean Liners of the World
 Maritime Heritage Network of the Pacific Northwest
 Maritime Museums in Britain and Ireland – Vessels
 National Park Service Maritime Heritage Program
 Naval and Maritime Museums List International (Except USA)
 Naval and Maritime Museums List United States of America
 National Register of Historic Vessels (United Kingdom)
 Submarine Museums in the United States
 World Ship Trust International Register of Historic Ships
 Indonesian Navy Submarine Monument

Ships